Corredores is a canton in the Puntarenas province of Costa Rica. The head city is Ciudad Neily in Corredor district.

History 
Corredores was created on 19 October 1973 by decree 5373.

Geography 
Corredores has an area of  km² and a mean elevation of  metres.

The lowland canton shares its eastern border with Panama. The Conte River marks the western limit. The northern boundary runs through the Zapote Ridge, one of the coastal mountain ranges.

Districts 
The canton of Corredores is subdivided into the following districts:
 Corredor
 La Cuesta
 Canoas
 Laurel

Demographics 

For the 2011 census, Corredores had a population of  inhabitants.

Transportation

Road transportation 
The canton is covered by the following road routes:

References 

Cantons of Puntarenas Province
Populated places in Puntarenas Province